"Addicted to Love" is a song by English rock singer Robert Palmer released in 1986. It is the third song on Palmer's eighth studio album Riptide (1985) and was released as its second single. The single version is a shorter edit of the full-length album version.

The song entered the Billboard Hot 100 chart the week ending 8 February 1986. The song ended up topping the Billboard Hot 100, as well as the Billboard Top Rock Tracks chart. It was one of the last 45 RPM singles to receive a million-selling Gold certification. It also reached number one in Australia and number five on the UK Singles Chart. "Addicted to Love" became Palmer's signature song, thanks in part to a popular video featuring high fashion models.

Background
Originally intended to be a duet with Chaka Khan, the song was made without her because her record company at the time would not grant her a release to work on Palmer's label, Island Records. Chaka Khan is still credited for the vocal arrangements in the album liner notes.

Andy Taylor of Duran Duran (and a bandmate of Palmer's from the Power Station) provides lead guitar. The other guitar part on the song is played by Eddie Martinez, while keyboards were played by Wally Badarou. As well as producing the song, Bernard Edwards also played the bass. The song is also notable for its opening drum solo by Tony Thompson, another Power Station alumnus.

Noddy Holder (the lead vocalist of English rock band Slade) stated in an interview that this song was the main track he wished he had written himself. "The one main song that I wish that I'd written and recorded is 'Addicted to Love' by Robert Palmer. To me, that's a perfect pop song. Everything about it really hits the nail on the head."

Music video

The music video (which uses the shorter single version of this song), directed by English photographer Terence Donovan, was one of the most noted of the era. The video features Palmer performing the song with an abstract "band", being a group of female models whose pale skin, heavy makeup, dark hair, and seductive, rather mannequin-like expression follow the style of women in Patrick Nagel paintings.

The five models in the video are Julie Pankhurst (keyboard), Patty Kelly (guitar), Mak Gilchrist (bass guitar), Julia Bolino (guitar), and Kathy Davies (drums).

Mak Gilchrist recalled to Q:
I was 21 and got the part on the strength of my modelling book. We were meant to look and "act" like showroom mannequins. Director Terence Donovan got us tipsy on a bottle of wine but as we were having our make-up retouched, I lost balance on my heels and knocked the top of my guitar into the back of Robert's head, and his face then hit the microphone.

In a 2013 interview, when asked why she was designated the drummer and not given a close-up shot, Kathy Davies jokingly replied, "I guess the naughty ones always get sent to the back." Davies added that she did not mind it because she thought Palmer "had a good bum."
Palmer recycled the video's models concept for the videos of three other songs of his: "I Didn't Mean to Turn You On" (also from Riptide), "Simply Irresistible", and the animated "Change His Ways" (both from Heavy Nova).

VH1's Pop-Up Video trivia about the video include the fact that a musician was hired to teach the models basic fingering techniques, but "gave up after about an hour and left." The episode also pointed out several choreographic errors, including the models moving out of sync with one another, and moving during points with no back beat, such as the second chorus.

The music video ranked at number 3 on VH1's Top 20 Videos of the 1980s and was the last video shown on long running UK music programme The Chart Show.

In the romantic comedy film Love Actually (2003), written and directed by Richard Curtis, the video for Billy Mack's song, "Christmas Is All Around", is a tribute to "Addicted to Love". The "Addicted to Love" models' blank expression is parodied in the "Christmas Is All Around" video, with the latter's models visibly bored to the point of yawning.

The models were also used in the spoof of the video in "Weird Al" Yankovic's UHF wearing glasses and moustaches. The music video was parodied in the videos of Stardust's "Music Sounds Better with You," Tone Lōc's "Wild Thing," Mr Blobby's "Mr Blobby", Bowling for Soup's "1985," Shania Twain's "Man! I Feel Like a Woman!", Shakira's "Las de la Intuición", Kasey Chambers's "If I Were You", Paula Abdul's "Forever Your Girl", Die Prinzen's "Alles nur geklaut", and Luca Carboni's "Luca lo stesso".

Track listing

Chart performance

Weekly charts

Year-end charts

Tina Turner version

American singer Tina Turner has made "Addicted to Love" a regular feature of her live shows since 1986, although her version did not make it onto the market until two years later.

A live recording from the 1986/1987 Break Every Rule Tour of the track was included on her Tina: Live in Europe album in 1988, and was also issued as the lead single to promote the album in certain territories — instead of "Nutbush City Limits" — and was a Top 20 hit in the Netherlands.

The two singles had the same B-sides: live recordings of "Overnight Sensation" and ZZ Top's "Legs" and near identical picture sleeves. The version of "Addicted to Love" issued on the single was in fact an alternate mix of the track; the single mix was later included on the European editions of her 1991 greatest hits album Simply the Best, as well as All the Best in 2004 and Tina! in 2008.  Another live version was included in Tina Live in 2009.

Official versions
Tina Live in Europe album mix – 5:22
Single Mix – 5:10
Tina Live – 4:54

Peak positions

See also
List of number-one singles in Australia during the 1980s
List of Billboard Hot 100 number ones of 1986
List of Cash Box Top 100 number-one singles of 1986
List of Billboard Mainstream Rock number-one songs of the 1980s
Addicted to Spuds

References

External links
 
The Video Models
 Julia Bolino
 Patty Kelly
 Julie Pankhurst
 Mak Gilchrist
 Kathy Davies

1985 songs
1986 singles
1988 singles
Robert Palmer (singer) songs
Tina Turner songs
Capitol Records singles
Island Records singles
Billboard Hot 100 number-one singles
Cashbox number-one singles
Grammy Award for Best Male Rock Vocal Performance
MTV Video Music Award for Best Male Video
Number-one singles in Australia
Song recordings produced by Bernard Edwards
Songs written by Robert Palmer (singer)